Joseph Peyton Wyatt Jr. (October 12, 1941 – April 4, 2022) served as a U.S. Representative from Texas.

Biography
Born in Victoria, Texas, Wyatt attended the Victoria County public schools.
He attended Victoria College, 1964.
B.A., University of Texas, 1968.
Graduate work, University of Houston Law Center, 1970.
Wyatt served in the United States Marine Corps Reserve from 1966 to 1970. He served on the staffs of Texas State Senator William Neff "Bill" Patman, United States Representative Clark W. Thompson, and Vice President Lyndon B. Johnson.
Auditor, Texas Alcoholic Beverage Commission, Austin, Texas.
Wyatt served as director of community affairs, private firm, Victoria, Texas. He served as member of the Texas House of Representatives from 1971 to 1979. Wyatt served on the Southern Legislative Conference and National Conference of State Legislatures. He served as delegate, Texas State Democratic conventions from 1968 to 1978, and as a delegate to the Democratic National Convention in 1964.

Wyatt was elected as a Democrat to the Ninety-sixth Congress (January 3, 1979 – January 3, 1981).

Wyatt served as special projects consultant.
He was a resident of Victoria, Texas. Wyatt died on April 4, 2022.

He ran for his former seat in 1982 as a Republican, but was defeated. The New York Times reported rumors that Wyatt had been involved in a homosexual scandal, charges which Patman used against him during the campaign.

References

Sources

1941 births
2022 deaths
Democratic Party members of the United States House of Representatives from Texas
Members of the Texas House of Representatives
People from Victoria, Texas
Texas Republicans
United States Marine Corps reservists